Ralph Walker may refer to:
Ralf Marc Walker (1872–1935), a.k.a. Ralph or R.M., owner of the Fifth Street Store and Walker Scott Department Stores in California
Ralph C. S. Walker, former head of the Humanities Division at Oxford and Kant specialist
Ralph Thomas Walker (1889–1973), American architect and President of the American Institute of Architects
Ralph Walker (engineer) (1749-1824), Scottish civil engineer associated with London Docks
Ralph Walker (Neighbours), fictional character on the Australian soap opera Neighbours